The Idol of the North is a lost 1921 American silent drama film directed by Roy William Neill and written by Frank S. Beresford and Tom McNamara based upon a story by J. Clarkson Miller. The film stars Dorothy Dalton, Edwin August, E.J. Ratcliffe, Riley Hatch, Jules Cowles, and Florence St. Leonard. The film was released on March 27, 1921, by Paramount Pictures.

Plot
As described in a film magazine, while Colette Brissac (Dalton) is inside a saloon in a northwestern gold camp begging for assistance her mother and father, who is a fugitive from the law, die outside the dance hall. She becomes an entertainer in the saloon and develops a cynical contempt for the men of the place, but soon becomes one of the big attractions of this crude stage. The men become angered at her attitude towards them and compel her to marry drunken stranger Martin Bates (August), a young engineer who has been spurned by a girl in New York. The two are thrown into a cabin and held virtually as prisoners. She has pity on his condition and remains as his wife. Martin regains his self-respect, strikes gold, and just as they are set to leave the camp the eastern girl appears seeking her former lover. Her husband, a Wall Street broker, follows her, bring the four into conflict, but there is a happy ending for the dance hall entertainer and her engineer husband.

Cast 
Dorothy Dalton as Colette Brissac
Edwin August as Martin Bates
E. J. Ratcliffe as Lucky Folsom
Riley Hatch as Ham Devlin
Jules Cowles as One-Eye Wallace
Florence St. Leonard as A Soubrette
Jessie Arnold as Big Blond
Marguerite Marsh as Gloria Waldron
Joe King as Sergeant McNair

References

External links 

1921 films
1920s English-language films
Silent American drama films
1921 drama films
Paramount Pictures films
Films directed by Roy William Neill
American black-and-white films
Lost American films
American silent feature films
1921 lost films
Lost drama films
1920s American films